Kiss Me Again (Kiss Me Again – ) is a 2018 Thai television series starring Sananthachat Thanapatpisal (Fon), Chutavuth Pattarakampol (March), Kanyawee Songmuang (Thanaerng), Tanutchai Wijitwongthong (Mond), Thitipoom Techaapaikhun (New), Tawan Vihokratana (Tay), Jintanutda Lummakanon (Pango) and Pirapat Watthanasetsiri (Earth).

Directed by Weerachit Thongjila and produced by GMMTV together with Housestories 8, the series was one of the ten television series for 2018 showcased by GMMTV in their "Series X" event on 1 February 2018. It premiered on GMM 25 and LINE TV on 22 April 2018, airing on Sundays at 20:30 ICT and 22:30 ICT, respectively. The series concluded on 22 July 2018.

Cast and characters 
Below are the cast of the series:

Main 
 Sananthachat Thanapatpisal (Fon) as Sanwan
 Chutavuth Pattarakampol (March) as R
 Kanyawee Songmuang (Thanaerng) as Sanson
 Tanutchai Wijitwongthong (Mond) as Matt
 Thitipoom Techaapaikhun (New) as Kao
 Tawan Vihokratana (Tay) as Pete
 Jintanutda Lummakanon (Pango) as Sansuay
 Pirapat Watthanasetsiri (Earth) as So

Supporting 
 Lapassalan Jiravechsoontornkul (Mild) as Sandee
 Jirakit Thawornwong (Mek) as Thada
 Worranit Thawornwong (Mook) as Sanrak
 Thanaboon Wanlopsirinun (Na) as Win
 Sattaphong Phiangphor (Tao) as Na
 Phurikulkrit Chusakdiskulwibul (Amp) as Pat
 Chanagun Arpornsutinan (Gunsmile) as Wayu
 Nachat Juntapun (Nicky) as June
 Noelle Klinneam (Tiny) as Khun Jane
 Alysaya Tsoi (Alice) as Sinee
 Krittanai Arsalprakit (Nammon) as Prize
 Juthapich Inn-Chan (Jamie) as Mint
 Pop Khamgasem as Chacha
 Chiwpreecha Thitichaya (Chat) as Sanwan's friend
 Kaimook Apasiri as Angie
 Pluem Pongpisal as Rain
 Natticha Chantaravareelekha (Fond) as Gift
 Suphakorn Sriphothong (Pod) as Sun
 Gawin Caskey (Fluke) as mork
 Saitharn Niyomkarn as a mother
 Phatchara Tubthong (Kapook) as Nicole
 Krittaphat Chanthanaphot as Pete's father
 Benja Singkharawat (Yangyi) as Kao's mother

Guest role 
 Achirawich Saliwattana (Gun) as Rit

Soundtrack

References

External links 
 Kiss Me Again on LINE TV
 
 GMMTV

Television series by GMMTV
Thai romantic comedy television series
Thai drama television series
2018 Thai television series debuts
2018 Thai television series endings
GMM 25 original programming
Television series by Housestories 8